Dan Bibby (born 6 February 1991) is an English rugby sevens player from Aspull, Wigan, Greater Manchester. He currently plays internationally as a fly half for the England national rugby sevens team and the Great Britain national rugby sevens team.

Youth and early career
Bibby attended Kirkham Grammar School. Bibby started playing for Aspull RFC, the only rugby union club in his area since Wigan is better known for rugby league. He later moved to play as a fly half for Fylde Rugby Club in 2008 and a year later was chosen to represent England Students in rugby union.

He later attended Cardiff Metropolitan University where he studied sports science and where he represented them in the British Universities and Colleges sevens competition final at Twickenham Stadium. After that he was invited by Sale Sharks to join them for the summer in 2011 and played for them in the Premiership Rugby Sevens Series.

International career
Bibby was called up to play for the England national rugby sevens team in 2012 in the Scotland Sevens. He also competed for England at the 2014 Commonwealth Games. In 2016, Bibby declared his intention to play at the 2016 Summer Olympics for the Great Britain national rugby sevens team. However he received a shoulder injury in the Australian Sevens which could have jeopardized his participation, however he was able to rejoin the Great Britain team for training. In July he was chosen for the final Great Britain Olympic team. In the quarter finals of the Olympic rugby sevens tournament, Bibby scored the decisive try and golden point in extra time for Great Britain against the Argentina national rugby sevens team after a 0–0 draw.

References

External links 
 
 
 
 

1991 births
Living people
People from Aspull
England international rugby sevens players
Fylde Rugby Club players
Sale Sharks players
Alumni of Cardiff Metropolitan University
Rugby union fly-halves
Rugby sevens players at the 2016 Summer Olympics
Olympic rugby sevens players of Great Britain
Great Britain national rugby sevens team players
Olympic silver medallists for Great Britain
Olympic medalists in rugby sevens
Medalists at the 2016 Summer Olympics
Male rugby sevens players
Rugby sevens players at the 2014 Commonwealth Games
Commonwealth Games rugby sevens players of England
Commonwealth Games medallists in rugby sevens
Commonwealth Games bronze medallists for England
Rugby sevens players at the 2020 Summer Olympics
People educated at Kirkham Grammar School
Medallists at the 2018 Commonwealth Games